University of Bagamoyo (UB) is a private university in Tanzania. It was started by the Tanzania Legal Education Trust (TANLET) and The Legal and Human Rights Centre (LHRC). It is located in Dar es Salaam  with its main campus being built in Kiromo, Bagamoyo.

References

External links
 

B
Universities in Dar es Salaam
Educational institutions established in 2010
2010 establishments in Tanzania